Massimo Giuliani (born 5 February 1951) is an Italian actor and voice actor.

Biography 
Born in Rome, Giuliani began his career debut at four years of age. Giuliani had an intensifying experience as a child actor throughout the 1950s and 1960s on cinema and television. His first film appearance was in the 1956 film Supreme Confession and he also voiced Arthur in the Italian-Language dub of the 1963 animated film The Sword in the Stone. This marked Giuliani's first dubbing contribution. He still continues acting as an adult.

As a voice actor, Giuliani is well known for providing the Italian voice of Fozzie Bear in The Muppets as well as Buck from the Ice Age film series and from 1996, he was the main Italian voice of Bugs Bunny from Looney Tunes until he passed on the role to Davide Garbolino in 2007. Giuliani has also dubbed Mel Gibson, Dudley Moore, John Belushi, Billy Crystal, John Candy, Andy García and Warwick Davis in some of their projects.

Giuliani is also an avid football fan. In the 1960s, he participated in a football youth squad but he left after four months due to his obligations as a child actor. In the early 2000s, he sparked controversy for impersonating footballer Francesco Totti on the show Convenscion. He has also made appearances at La Partita del cuore.

Personal life 
Giuliani is married to dubbing director Tiziana Lattuca. He is also the father of voice actor Daniele Giuliani and the uncle of voice actress Claudia Catani.

Filmography

Cinema 
Supreme Confession (1956)
Vento di primavera (1959)
Nuda fra le tigri (1959)
Accadde a Vienna (1960)
I Am Semiramis (1962)
I terribili 7 (1963)
Liolà (1963)
Giacobbe, l'uomo che lottò con Dio (1963)
Face in the Rain (1963)
I patriarchi (1964)
Seasons of Our Love (1965)
The Sunday Woman (1975)
The Face with Two Left Feet (1979)
I Don't Understand You Anymore (1980)
The Children Thief (1991)
L'ultimo innocente (1992)
Ci hai rotto papà (1993)

Television
Il romanzo di un maestro (1959)
Le avventure della squadra di stoppa (1964)
Avventure in IV B (1964)
David Copperfield (1965)
Diario partigiano (1970)
Processo ad un atto di valore (1972)
I ragazzi della 3ª C (1987-1989)
Classe di ferro (1989)
...Se non avessi l'amore (1991)
Pazza famiglia (1995)
S.P.Q.R. (1998)
Anni '60 (1999)
Don Matteo (2004)
Carabinieri - Sotto copertura (2005)
Imperium: Pompeii (2007)

Dubbing roles

Animation
Arthur in The Sword in the Stone
Young Thumper in Bambi (1968 redub)
Fozzie Bear in The Muppet Movie
Fozzie Bear in The Great Muppet Caper
Fozzie Bear (Fozziwig) / Swedish Chef in The Muppet Christmas Carol
Fozzie Bear (Squire Trelawney) in Muppet Treasure Island
Fozzie Bear in Muppets From Space
Fozzie Bear in It's a Very Merry Muppet Christmas Movie
Fozzie Bear (Cowardly Lion) in The Muppets' Wizard of Oz
Fozzie Bear in The Muppets
Fozzie Bear in Muppets Most Wanted
Fozzie Bear in Muppet Babies
Bugs Bunny in Looney Tunes (1996-2006)
Bugs Bunny in Merrie Melodies (1996-2006)
Buck in Ice Age: Dawn of the Dinosaurs
Buck in Ice Age: Collision Course
Buck in The Ice Age Adventures of Buck Wild
Dusty Rust-eze in Cars 3

Live action
Jake "Joilet" Blues in The Blues Brothers
Frank Dunne in Gallipoli
Guy Hamilton in The Year of Living Dangerously
Fletcher Christian in The Bounty
Tom Garvey in The River
Ed Biddle in Mrs. Soffel
Max Rockatansky in Mad Max Beyond Thunderdome
Barf in Spaceballs
George Stone / Giuseppe Petri in The Untouchables
Ben Chase in Criminal Law
Rick Becker in Loaded Weapon 1
Nikanor "Nick" Chevotarevich in The Deer Hunter
Arthur Bach in Arthur
Arthur Bach in Arthur 2: On the Rocks
Francis Fratelli in The Goonies
Larry Donner in Throw Momma from the Train
The Leprechaun in Leprechaun
Rob Salinger in Micki & Maude
Jack Hammond in Like Father Like Son
Melvyn Orton in Blame It on the Bellboy
Angel Maldonado in 8 Million Ways to Die
Norbert "Norby" LeBlaw in Baby's Day Out
Eddie Moscone in Midnight Run
Ramirez in Stand and Deliver
Nick "Goose" Bradshaw in Top Gun
Gray Baker in Dead Again
Ernie Souchak in Continental Divide
Danny Costanzo in Running Scared

References

External links

1951 births
Living people
Male actors from Rome
Italian male voice actors
Italian male film actors
Italian male television actors
Italian male child actors
Italian male radio actors
Italian voice directors
20th-century Italian male actors
21st-century Italian male actors